Jacques Gaffarel (1601–1681) was a French scholar and astrologer. He followed the family tradition of studying medicine, and then became a priest, but mainly developed his interests in the fields of natural history and Oriental occultism, gaining fluency in the Hebrew, Persian, and Arabic languages.

Gaffarel included in his work two large folding plates of "the Celestial Constellations expressed by Hebrew characters", and asserted that the letters of the Hebrew alphabet could be interpreted from the constellations and that the heavens could be read as if a book.

His book enjoyed phenomenal success. René Descartes read it with interest and the French physician and mathematician Pierre Gassendi (1592–1655) defended it. Unheard-of Curiosities was one of 1,500 books in the Library of Sir Thomas Browne and one of the varied sources of his encyclopaedia entitled Pseudodoxia Epidemica. Browne alludes to Gaffarel's astrology in The Garden of Cyrus thus:

Could we satisfy our selves in the position of the lights above, or discover the wisdom of that order so invariably maintained in the fixed stars of heaven......we might abate.....the strange Cryptography of Gaffarell in his Starrie Booke of Heaven.

Gaffarel contributed to the debate between Marin Mersenne and Robert Fludd.

On the other hand, the Sorbonne rejected Gaffarel's work and ridiculed him; however, he gained the protection of the powerful Cardinal Richelieu, who made him his librarian and sent him off first to Italy, then to Greece and Asia to retrieve rare books (reportedly including manuscripts by Pico della Mirandola).

References

External links

 Examples of Gaffarel's astrological writing
 Charab in the Stars
 The Dial of Achaz
 CELESTIAL ALPHABET EVENT

Bibliography
Hiro Hirai (ed.), Jacques Gaffarel between Magic and Science (Rome: Serra, 2014). 

Saverio Campanini, Eine späte Apologie der Kabbala. Die Abdita divinae Cabalae Mysteria des Jacques Gaffarel, in T. Frank – U. Kocher – U. Tarnow (edd.), Topik und Tradition. Prozesse der Neuordnung von Wissensüberlieferungen des 13. bis 17. Jahrhunderts, Göttingen 2007, pp. 325–351.

1601 births
1681 deaths
Christian Hebraists
French astrologers
17th-century astrologers
French librarians